Frederick Hayden Hughs Coe (December 23, 1914 – April 29, 1979) was an American television producer and director most famous for The Goodyear Television Playhouse/The Philco Television Playhouse in 1948-1955 and Playhouse 90 from 1957 to 1959. Among the live TV dramas he produced were Marty and The Trip to Bountiful for Goodyear/Philco, Peter Pan for Producers' Showcase, and Days of Wine and Roses for Playhouse 90.

Early life
Frederick Hayden Hughs Coe was born on December 23, 1914, in Alligator, Mississippi. His father, F. H. H. Coe, was an attorney; his mother, Annette Harrell Coe, was a nurse. Coe grew up in Buckhorn, Kentucky, and Nashville, Tennessee. He attended Peabody Demonstration School in Nashville and Peabody College, before studying at the Yale Drama School. While he lived in Nashville he was active with the Nashville Community Playhouse and founded the Hillsboro Players.

Career 
Coe went to Columbia, South Carolina, in 1940 after his graduate work at Yale. There he was director and manager of the Town Theater, which he developed into a venue for new plays.

He started as a production manager at NBC in 1945. Coe made his mark in the early years of network television when Lights Out moved from radio to TV on July 3, 1946. Variety reviewed:
Credit for the show's all-around excellence belongs jointly to scripter Wyllis Cooper and producer Fred Coe. Cooper was the last writer of the radio version with an eight-week series on the NBC net last summer. (Show returns for eight weeks Sat. (6) as replacement for Judy Canova). He followed Arch Oboler at the task and has made the switch from radio to tele without a single letdown in the program's eerie quality. Coe, whose light on NBC television has been partly hidden in the past by Ed Sobol and Ernie Colling, both of whom won ATS awards this last year, has come into his own with this show and should now rank right at the top of the heap. Story, titled First Person Singular, concerned a psychopathic killer whose wife's constant nagging, extreme sloppiness, etc., led him to strangle her in their apartment on one of those blistering summer evenings. Killer was never seen, with the camera following the action and taking in just what the eyes of the murderer would see. Thoughts in the killer's subconscious, meanwhile, told what might go on in the mind of such a person as he contemplates his crime, is convicted in court and then hanged. Coe achieved some admirable effects with the camera, drawing the viewer both into the killer's mind and into the action. Use of a spiral montage effect bridged the gap between scenes very well and the integration of film to point up the killer's dream of a cool, placid existence and to heighten the shock effect as the hangman ended his life was excellent. Technical director Bill States was on the beam with the controls in following Coe's direction.
Coe became executive producer of Mr. Peepers in 1952 and kept that job until 1955. The program won a Peabody Award in 1953. He won an Emmy Award in 1954 as Best Producer of a Live Series for his work on Producer's Showcase.

Writers
Coe encouraged writers, including Paddy Chayefsky, Horton Foote, Tad Mosel, JP Miller, Summer Locke Elliott, Robert Alan Aurthur, and Gore Vidal. Numerous important actors appeared on Coe's shows, which were directed by, among others, Vincent Donohue, Delbert Mann and Arthur Penn.

Broadway
Coe also was a significant producer on Broadway. His plays include The Trip to Bountiful, The Miracle Worker, Two for the Seesaw, All the Way Home, A Thousand Clowns, and Wait Until Dark. He also produced the film versions of The Miracle Worker and A Thousand Clowns, the latter of which he directed.

Personal life and death
Coe was married to, and divorced from, Alice Griggs, and they had two children. At the time of his death he was legally separated from his second wife, Joyce Beeler, with who he had two children. He died of a heart attack on April 29, 1979, in Los Angeles, aged 64. He is buried in Green River Cemetery in Springs, New York.

Legacy 
 
His biography, The Man in the Shadows: Fred Coe and the Golden Age of Television by Jon Krampner, was published by Rutgers University Press in 1997. The UCLA Film and Television Archive has kinescopes of many Coe productions and has made some digital transfers. The Wisconsin Center for Film and Theater Research also has kinescopes.

Filmography
 The Left Handed Gun (1958) (producer)
 The Miracle Worker (1962) (producer)
 A Thousand Clowns (1965) (director, producer)
 Me, Natalie (1969) (director)

References

External links

Finding Aid for the Fred Coe Papers at the Wisconsin Center for Film and Theater Research
Museum TV profile

1914 births
1979 deaths
20th-century American businesspeople
American television directors
American theatre managers and producers
Burials at Green River Cemetery
English-language film directors
Film directors from Mississippi
Film producers from Mississippi
Peabody College alumni
People from Bolivar County, Mississippi
People from Springs, New York
Television producers from New York (state)
United States Army Air Forces personnel of World War II
Yale School of Drama alumni